Nanda Kumar Deb Barma is a Tipra playwright, poet and lyricist from Tripura. He is known for his works of literature in Kokborok language and Kokborok Drama. Nanda Kumar Deb Barma is author of novels such as Rung (2001), and compilations of works such as Thungnuk Bwchap (2015). He has been one of the active advocates for Kokborok development in the field of literature and education and is the president of Kokborok Sahitya Sabha.

Life 
Nanda Kumar was born in Bishramganj, which is a small town and the headquarter of Sepahijala District in the Indian state of Tripura.

Career 
He has published a number of poetry and drama books. Nanda Kumar Deb Barma is also a dramatist, having performed both drama and music on All India Radio and Doordarshan and other places.  He is an editor at the Tripura Legislative Assembly and presently resides in the state's capital Agartala.

Works 

This is the lists of plays written or directed by Nanda Kumar Deb Barma.  Most of the plays were performed by casts from the Sampili Theatre Centre based at Tripura. 

Bubar, Mukunne, Kokkisa, Koktanghai, Mari, Randijwkma, Sikhok, Reg-Swnam, Bolongni Muktarwi Sarao, Koktun, Khotalbai, Kwplai, Kantomoni, Imangni Bwsarok, Shehi Bukhukswk Ha, Nuai, Rung, Sundurjak, Yapiri, Dogar, Longtoraini Eklobyo, Bwsak Kaisao, Da-kuphur, Chobani Swkang, Swkango Choba, Kotor Buma-Bwsa.

Selected published works 
Kokborok Poetry
Simalwng Sakao Holongni Khum (Stone Flowers at the Pyre)
Bolongni Bwsagursong Mwsao (Dances of Jungle Girls) 
Ani Ganao Ang (Me beside me) 
Dugmalino (To a Flower) 

Translated Works

 The Story (2005)  
 A Trip to the Shakhangtang Hill (2005)

References 

Writers from Tripura
Tripuri people
1950 births
Living people
Indian male dramatists and playwrights
Tripura University alumni
MBB College alumni